Army FM (   is a Ukrainian radio station owned and operated by the Ministry of Defence. Army FM was sponsored by the American nonprofit, Spirit of America, and started broadcasting on March 1, 2016 in test mode. The station broadcasts news and music in the Ukrainian and Russian languages. It broadcasts online, via satellite and in some cities via FM. Its main aim is to counter pro-Russian propaganda in the Donbas The signal is broadcast in the Russian occupied eastern regions by a network of 28 transmitters.

The studios and editorial office is located in the former headquarters of the Red Army in Kyiv.

References

External links 
 

Radio stations in Ukraine
Ukrainian-language radio stations
Ministry of Defence (Ukraine)